This article serves as an index - as complete as possible - of all the honorific orders or similar decorations received by the Monegasque princely family, classified by continent, awarding country and recipient.

Monaco

 Prince Albert II:
 Sovereign Knight Grand Cross with Collar of the Order of Saint Charles
 Sovereign Knight Grand Cross of the Order of the Crown 
 Sovereign Knight Grand Cross with Collar of the Order of Grimaldi
 Sovereign Knight Commander of the Order of Cultural Merit, 1st Class
 Princess Charlene: 
 Knight Grand Cross of the Order of Saint Charles
 Medal for Physical Education and Sports, First Class
 Prince Jacques, Hereditary Prince: Knight Grand Cross of the Order of Grimaldi
 Princess Gabriella, Countess of Carladès: Grand Officer  of the Order of Grimaldi
 Princess Caroline, Princess of Hanover:
 Knight Grand Cross of the Order of Saint-Charles
 Knight Commander of the Order of Cultural Merit, 1st Class
 Princess Stéphanie, Countess of Polignac:
 Knight Grand Cross of the Order of Grimaldi
 Chancellor Recipient of the Monaco Red Cross Medal

Europe

Bulgaria
 Prince Albert II: Grand Cross of the Order of Stara Planina

Croatia
 Prince Albert II: Grand Cross of the Grand Order of King Tomislav

France
 Prince Albert II:
 Knight Grand Cross of the Legion of Honour
 Grand Cross of the National Order of Merit
 Commander of the Order of Academic Palms, 1st Class
 Princess Caroline, Princess of Hanover: 
 Commander of the Order of Agricultural Merit, 1st Class
 Commander of the Order of Arts and Letters, 1st Class
 Recipient of the Badge of the 17th Parachute Engineer Regiment

Germany
 Prince Albert II:
 Grand Cross special class of the Order of Merit of the Federal Republic of Germany

Italy

Vatican
 Prince Albert II: Knight Grand Cross of the Order of the Holy Sepulchre
 Knight of the Collar of the Order of the Holy Sepulchre

Italian Royal Family
 Prince Albert II: Knight Grand Cordon of the Order of Saints Maurice and Lazarus

Sovereign Military Order of Malta
 Prince Albert II:
 Bailiff Knight Grand Cross of Honour and Devotion of the Sovereign Military Order of Malta, 3rd First Class
 Knight Grand Cross with Collar of the Order of Pro Merito Melitensi

Italian republic
 Prince Albert II: Knight Grand Cross with Collar of the Order of Merit of the Italian Republic
 Princess Charlene: Grand Cross of the Order of the Star of Italy

Two Sicilian Royal Family
 Prince Albert II: Knight of the Order of Saint Januarius (7 November 2017)
 Prince Albert II: Bailiff Knight Grand Cross with Collar of Justice of the Sacred Military Constantinian Order of Saint George (7 November 2017)

Lithuania
 Prince Albert II: Grand Cross of the Order of Vytautas the Great

Montenegrin Royal Family
 Prince Albert II: Knight Grand Cross of the Order of Prince Danilo I

Poland
 Prince Albert II: Grand Cross of the Order of Merit of the Republic of Poland
 Princess Charlene: Grand Cross of the Order of Merit of the Republic of Poland

Portugal
Prince Albert II: Grand Collar of the Order of Prince Henry (14 october 2022)

Romania
 Prince Albert II: Collar of the Order of the Star of Romania

San Marino
 Prince Albert II: Grand Cross of the Order of Saint Agatha
 Collar of the Order of San Marino (2015)

Serbia
 Prince Albert II: Grand Cross of Order of the Republic of Serbia (2022)

Slovakia
 Prince Albert II: Grand Cross (or 1st Class) of the Order of the White Double Cross (2017)

Sweden
 Prince Albert II: Recipient of the 50th Birthday Badge Medal of King Carl XVI Gustaf
 Recipient of the 70th Birthday Badge Medal of King Carl XVI Gustaf
 Princess Caroline, Princess of Hanover: Recipient of the 50th Birthday Badge Medal of King Carl XVI Gustaf

American foreign honours

Costa Rica 
 Albert II, Prince of Monaco :  Grand Cross with Gold Star of the National Order Juan Mora Fernández (es, 2003)

El Salvador 
 Albert II, Prince of Monaco : Grand Collar of the Order of the Liberator of the Slaves José Simeón Cañas (es, 2002)

Panama 
 Albert II, Prince of Monaco : Grand Cross of the Order of Vasco Núñez de Balboa (2002)

Peru 
 Albert II, Prince of Monaco : Grand Cross of the Order of the Sun (2003)

African foreign honours

Burkina Faso 
 Albert II, Prince of Monaco : Grand Officer of the National Order of Burkina Faso (17 February 2012)

Mali 
 Albert II, Prince of Monaco : Grand Cross of the National Order of Mali (12 February 2012)

Niger 
 Albert II, Prince of Monaco : Grand Cross of the National Order of Niger (March 1998)

Senegal 
 Albert II, Prince of Monaco : Grand Officer (May 1977), later Grand Cross (2012) of the Order of the Lion

Tunisia 
 Albert II, Prince of Monaco : Grand Cordon of the Order of 7 November (September 2006)

Asian foreign honours

Middle East

Jordan 
 Albert II, Prince of Monaco : Grand Cordon of the Supreme Order of the Renaissance (before 07/2011)

Lebanon 
 Albert II, Prince of Monaco : Grand Cordon of the Order of Merit (before 07/2011)

References 

Orders, decorations, and medals of Monaco
Monaco